Bernardo Elonga Molico (born 22 February 1961) is an Equatoguinean middle-distance runner. He competed in the 1500 metres at the 1988 Summer Olympics and the 1992 Summer Olympics.

References

1961 births
Living people
Athletes (track and field) at the 1988 Summer Olympics
Athletes (track and field) at the 1992 Summer Olympics
Equatoguinean male middle-distance runners
Olympic athletes of Equatorial Guinea
Place of birth missing (living people)